Simón Bolívar is a 1942 Mexican historical drama film directed by Miguel Contreras Torres and starring Julián Soler, Marina Tamayo and Carlos Orellana. It is a biopic of the revolutionary Simón Bolívar who fought to end Spanish rule over much of Latin America.

Cast
 Julián Soler - Simón Bolívar
 Marina Tamayo - Manuela Sáenz
 Carlos Orellana - General José Antonio Páez
 Margarita Mora - Josefina Machado
 Anita Blanch - Fanny du Villars
 Domingo Soler - General Jacinto Lara
 Pedro Armendáriz - General Briceño Méndez
 Julio Villarreal - General Pablo Morillo
 Carlos López Moctezuma - General José Tomás Boves
 Francisco Jambrina - Mariscal Antonio José de Sucre
 Miguel Inclán - Sargento Pérez
 Carmen Molina - María Teresa del Toro
 Tito Junco - General Francisco de Paula Santander
 Alberto G. Vázquez - General José de San Martín
 Víctor Manuel Mendoza - La Mar
 Víctor Urruchúa - General José María Córdova
 Miguel Tamayo - Generalisimo Francisco de Miranda
 Eduardo González Pliego - General Carlos Soublette
 Felipe Montoya - General Mariano Montilla
 Ricardo Beltri - Canónigo Córtes de Madariega
 Alberto Espinoza - General Jose Félix Rivas
 Manuel Dondé - General Manuel Piar
 Manuel Fábregas - Fernando Bolívar
 Francisco Laboriel - Pedro Camejo
 Carlos L. Cabello - General William Miller
 Arturo Soto Rangel - Marqués y Coronel del Toro
 Max Meyer - Barón Alejandro de Humboldt
 Feliciano Rueda - Doctor Prospero Reverand
 Ricardo Carti - Bacuero
 Ernesto Finance - Obispo Estevez
 Luis G. Barreiro - General Barreiro
 José Pidal - General Domingo Monteverde
 Ramón G. Larrea - La Torre
 Victorio Blanco - Renovales
 Consuelo de Alba - Anita L. Blanchard
 Margarita Cortés - María Antonia Bolívar
 Mercedes Cortés - Juana Bolívar
 Conchita Gentil Arcos - Señora del Toro

External links

1942 films
1940s historical drama films
Mexican biographical drama films
Mexican historical drama films
Films directed by Miguel Contreras Torres
1940s Spanish-language films
Films set in Colombia
Films set in Peru
Films set in South America
Films set in the 1810s
Films set in the 1820s
Films set in Venezuela
Cultural depictions of Simón Bolívar
Mexican black-and-white films
1940s biographical drama films
1942 drama films
1940s Mexican films